European route E23 is a series of roads in Europe, part of the United Nations International E-road network.

Route

Links with other European routes 
 At Metz, it links with the E21, the E25, the E50, and the E411.
 It links with the E21 at Nancy.
 Further along at Remiremont it joins with the E512.
 At Vesoul it connects to the E54.
 Just before the Swiss border at Besançon, it makes a connection to the E60.
 At its final destination of Lausanne it connects with the E25 and the E62.

External links 
 UN Economic Commission for Europe: Overall Map of E-road Network (2007)

23
E023
E023